The Embassy of Japan in Ankara is the diplomatic mission of Japan to Turkey. SUZUKI Kazuhiro has been the current ambassador since October 2020. The embassy was opened on 4 July 1953.

References 

Ankara
Japan
Japan–Turkey relations